Oulu Nice Soccer (abbr. ONS) is a women's association football club from Oulu, Finland, currently playing in the Finnish women's premier division Naisten Liiga.

Current squad

Notable former players 
 Ode Fulutudilu

External links 
Official Homepage

References 

Women's football clubs in Finland
Association football clubs established in 2006
2006 establishments in Finland
Sport in Oulu